Life as It Should Be is a 2020 Dutch film directed by Ruud Schuurman. The film is based on the book of the same name by Dutch model, writer and host Daphne Deckers.

The film won the Golden Film award after having sold 100,000 tickets. It was the third highest-grossing Dutch film of 2020. It was also the fourth best visited Dutch film of 2020.

In March 2022, the sequel Alles is nog steeds zoals het zou moeten zijn was announced.

References

External links 
 

2020 films
Dutch comedy-drama films
2020s Dutch-language films